Encephalartos heenanii is a species of cycad in Southern Transvaal Province, South Africa.

Description
It is an arborescent plant, with a stem up to 3 m tall and with a diameter of 25–35 cm that often has shoots or branches that branch off from the base.

The leaves are 100–125 cm long, light green in color. The spine is sometimes twisted in a spiral and the upper part is clearly curved. The lanceolate leaflets, 12–15 cm long, are arranged on the rachis in the opposite way, at an angle of 45-80°; the margins are integer and smooth. The leaves of the basal part are smaller, but they are not reduced to spines.

It is a dioecious species, with male ovoid-shaped cones, yellow in color, 27–30 cm long and 15–17 cm wide. On each plant they grow up to three at a time. The female cones, of the same shape, are 23–30 cm long and have a diameter of 17–18 cm. Usually each plant produces only one, but up to three can rarely be present.

The seeds, 23–25 mm long, have an oblong shape and are covered by a red flesh.

References

External links

heenanii